Sébastien Beaulieu (born 4 January 1991) is a Canadian snowboarder who competes internationally in the alpine snowboard discipline.

Career
Beaulieu has competed at three Senior World Championships in 2017, 2019 and 2021. Beaulieu's best performances came in 2019 and 2021, where he finished 27th in the parallel giant slalom event each time.

In January 2022, Beaulieu was initially not named to Canada's 2022 Olympic team. However, after an appeal process Beaulieu along with three other snowboarders were added to the team in the parallel giant slalom event.

References

External links
 

1991 births
Living people
Sportspeople from Quebec City
Canadian male snowboarders
Snowboarders at the 2022 Winter Olympics
Olympic snowboarders of Canada